Joseph E. Brinn was an American basketball player and coach. He played for the Trinity Blue and White (now the Duke Blue Devils) in 1910 and 1911, and then served as the team's head coach in 1912–13.

Head coaching record

References

External links
J.E. Brinn at Sports-Reference.com

Duke Blue Devils men's basketball coaches
Duke Blue Devils men's basketball players
American men's basketball players
Guards (basketball)